"Ooh Ja Ja" is a song by British recording act Pussyfoot. It was released in Australia in March 1977 as the second single from Pussyfoot's debut studio album, Pussyfootin' Round... With Love. The song peaked at number 20 on the Australian Kent Music Report.

Track listing
7-inch single (EMI-11376)
A. "Ooh Ja Ja"
B. "I Want You to Love Me"

Charts

References

1976 singles
1976 songs
EMI Records singles